Ravinder Singh may refer to:

 Ravinder Singh (author), Indian novelist
 Ravinder Singh (cricketer), Indian cricketer for Chandigarh Lions
 Ravinder Singh (footballer) (born 1991), Indian football player 
 Ravinder Singh (general), chief of the Singapore Army
 Ravinder Singh (wrestler), Indian wrestler
 Ravinder Pal Singh, former Indian hockey player
 Ravinderpal Singh, Canadian cricketer 
 Ravinder Singh Tut (born 1969), British Olympic wrestler

See also
 Ravinder Singh Bopara, English cricket commonly known as Ravi Bopara (born 1985)